Abandoned vehicles are decrepit cars or car wrecks or cars that have become useless in other ways, which are abandoned and illegally dumped in the environment. Abandoned vehicles will be tagged with an official notice when found or reported. Criteria for "abandonment" may differ, and a minimum duration of abandonment in the order of a few days to weeks is required. When reporting such a vehicle, the required data will usually comprise the exact location, the make, colour and type, and - if available and readable - possibly the VIN and the licence plate. Costs for removal will as a rule be taken by public councils.

Environmental impact

Abandoned cars use up space in the environment and, just like other waste, pose considerable risks for public health.

Specific rules and regulations 
A common definition is that the vehicle must have been left on private or public property for a minimum duration (≥ 24 hours) or it hasn't been reclaimed after being impounded after a minimum number of days.

United States
The definition of an "abandoned vehicle" varies widely across the states and larger cities of the US.
In Iowa, for example, the following criteria apply:

"Abandoned vehicle" means any of the following:
A vehicle that has been left unattended on public property for more than twenty-four hours and lacks current registration plates or two or more wheels or other parts which renders the vehicle totally inoperable.
A vehicle that has remained illegally on public property for more than twenty-four hours.
A vehicle that has been unlawfully parked on private property or has been placed on private property without the consent of the owner or person in control of the property for more than twenty-four hours.
A vehicle that has been legally impounded by order of a police authority and has not been reclaimed for a period of ten days. However, a police authority may declare the vehicle abandoned within the ten-day period by notifying the owner.
Any vehicle parked on the highway determined by a police authority to create a hazard to other vehicle traffic.
A vehicle that has been impounded by order of the court and whose owner has not paid the impoundment fees after notification by the person or agency responsible for carrying out the impoundment order.

A number of differing criteria are listed here in no specific order:
 Arizona: According to Arizona law, an "abandoned vehicle" is a vehicle, trailer or semitrailer that is subject to registration and has been abandoned on public or private property, whether lost, stolen, abandoned or otherwise unclaimed.
 Boston: Abandoned vehicles are safety hazards and they blight our neighborhoods.  If you abandon your car  in Boston, we have the right to fine you, tow your vehicle, and take further action. The City of Boston can legally take possession of vehicles left standing on City streets for more than 72 hours. We enforce this regulation if 1)we receive a complaint from a resident, or 2) the vehicle poses a safety hazard. We don't automatically consider a vehicle parked on the same street for more than 72 hours abandoned.
 Texas: A motor vehicle is abandoned if the motor vehicle:
 is inoperable, is more than five years old, and has been left unattended on public property for more than 48 hours;
 has remained illegally on public property for more than 48 hours;
 has remained on private property without the consent of the owner or person in charge of the property for more than 48 hours;
 has been left unattended on the right-of-way of a designated county, state, or federal highway for more than 48 hours;
 has been left unattended for more than 24 hours on the right-of-way of a turnpike project constructed and maintained by the Texas Turnpike Authority division of the Texas Department of Transportation or a controlled access highway
 New York: With License Plates: You can report an abandoned vehicle with at least one fixed metal license plate or in-transit paper registration plate if it has been left on public property for at least 48 hours. Officers from your local police precinct will respond when they are not handling emergency situations. The vehicle's owner will be responsible for all towing and storage fees. Without License Plates: You can report a vehicle without license plates abandoned on a City street or sidewalk. The Department of Sanitation will investigate and tag the vehicle. Once it is tagged, it will be removed within three business days.
Seattle: An abandoned vehicle is defined as a vehicle within Seattle City Limits on a public street or city property for over 72 hours.

Australia
As in the US, there is not one single set of rules. Following is an arbitrary selection:
Queensland: It is an offence to leave a vehicle (a car, truck or motorbike) on the roadway or footpath once the vehicle registration has expired. Once your vehicle registration expires, move your vehicle onto private property to avoid an infringement and possible removal of your vehicle by the council. If your vehicle is registered and is not parked illegally or dangerously, it will not be considered abandoned.
City of Newcastle: The council classifies a vehicle as being abandoned when the vehicle is parked on a public street and the owner of the vehicle can not be identified. A vehicle may be unregistered and parked on a public street but not necessarily abandoned. Enquiries would be made to identify the owner, establish the reasons as to why the vehicle is parked on the street and the owner can be requested to remove the vehicle.
Northern Territory: There are two general types of abandoned vehicles:
 A vehicle that has been left unattended in a public place or on a road or road related area.
 A vehicle that has been abandoned on private property for more than six months.

See also
Attractive nuisance doctrine
Decrepit car
Getaway car
Lost, mislaid, and abandoned property
Vehicle recycling

References

Environmental crime
Hazardous motor vehicle activities
Energy law